Rahdar Khaneh (also Romanized as Rāhdār Khāneh) is a village in Ahandan Rural District, in the Central District of Lahijan County, Gilan Province, Iran. At the 2006 census, its population was 36, in 10 families.

References 

Populated places in Lahijan County